Lansing Beach (June 18, 1860 – April 2, 1945) was a U.S. Army officer who served for a time as Chief of Engineers.

Early life
Born in Dubuque, Iowa, Beach graduated third in the United States Military Academy class of 1882 and was commissioned in the Corps of Engineers.

Military career
Beach developed plans for the reconstruction of the Muskingum River locks and dams soon after Ohio ceded the state-built improvements to the federal government in 1887. From 1894 to 1901 he worked on public improvements in the District of Columbia, serving as Engineer Commissioner there in 1898–1901. As Detroit District Engineer in 1901–05, he oversaw harbor improvements as far west as Duluth. Beach supervised improvements along the Louisiana Gulf Coast in 1908–12 and in Baltimore in 1912–15. He also oversaw the entire Gulf Division in six of those seven years and the Central Division in 1915–20. In the latter capacity and as Chief of Engineers, he oversaw construction of the huge Wilson Locks and Dam on the Tennessee River. Beach also served on the Mississippi River Commission and the Board of Engineers for Rivers and Harbors. After his four-year tour as Chief of Engineers, he retired on June 18, 1924. After retirement, General Beach served as consulting engineer for various business interests in the United States and Mexico. He was President of the American Society of Military Engineers, and a member of the International Water Commission from 1924 to 1930.

Beach died in Pasadena, California on April 2, 1945. He was interred at Arlington National Cemetery beside his wife Anna May (Dillon) Beach (1861–1934) on January 29, 1946.

References

This article contains public domain text from

1860 births
1945 deaths
People from Dubuque, Iowa
United States Military Academy alumni
Military personnel from Iowa
United States Army Corps of Engineers personnel
Members of the Board of Commissioners for the District of Columbia
United States Army generals of World War I
United States Army Corps of Engineers Chiefs of Engineers
United States Army generals
Burials at Arlington National Cemetery